John Blackman (born 14 July 1947) is an Australian radio and television presenter, voice-artist and comedy writer and author. He is most widely known for his voice-over work for the long-running Nine Network comedy variety show Hey Hey It's Saturday from 1971 until 1999 and then returning for the reunion specials in 2009 and in 2021, with a brief relaunch in 2010.

Biography
Blackman grew up in the Victorian suburb of Mount Waverley, where he attended Syndal Primary School until 1959 and completed year 10 at Syndal Technical School in 1963. He was an avid supporter of the Fitzroy Football Club, now the Brisbane Lions. On leaving school (and home) at 16, he worked in a succession of occupations: customs clerk, cash van salesman for a cigarette distributor, sales representative for a perfume company, and spruiker in the Myer Bargain Basement. At the age of 22, he decided on a career in radio.

He has worked in radio since 1969 but is probably best known for his 28-year stint as announcer and character voice-over for the Nine Network's Hey Hey It's Saturday, Australia's longest-running variety show. One of his best-known characters was a stick puppet known as "Dickie Knee".

In 1969, he joined 2GN Goulburn as an announcer, newsreader, copywriter, salesman, and record librarian.

In 1970, he joined 2CA Canberra, where he worked in a variety of on-air shifts for 18 months until mid-1971, when he joined 3AW in Melbourne. As evening announcer, Blackman worked with the Reverend Alex Kenworthy for a number of years on "Nightline".

In 1974, he joined 3AK where he hosted the morning show until 1975, when he moved to Sydney to join 2UE as a "floating" announcer for just three months. At TCN-9 in Sydney, he was a staff continuity announcer and daytime newsreader for National Nine News alongside his work on Hey Hey It's Saturday, which he would do "down the line" to GTV-9 in Melbourne every Saturday from an announcing booth at TCN-9.

He returned to 3AK Melbourne in 1979 to host the breakfast show until 1981. Later that year, he joined 3AW to host their breakfast show with Paul Barber. After Barber parted company with 3AW not long afterwards, Blackman was joined by former ATV-0 newsreader and staff announcer, Bruce Mansfield. This collaboration became one of the most successful combinations in Australian radio history, with 3AW breakfast topping the ratings for 5 consecutive years until 1986.

After leaving 3AW in controversial circumstances on 30 April 1986, Blackman became part of the short-lived, ill-fated CBC Network (2UE/3AK) experiment and, in December of that year, his contract was not renewed.

From 1987 to 1990, he co-hosted a breakfast show on 3UZ (now RSN Racing & Sport) with Coodabeen Champions member Ian Cover and later, Wilbur Wilde.

In 1997, after a 7-year hiatus from radio Blackman was employed as the co-host of the 3AK breakfast show with Anna "Pinky" Pinkus and Denis Donoghue (Lawyers, Guns & Money) until 2000.

In 2004, he joined Triple M Adelaide and was co-host of The John Blackman & Jane Reilly Breakfast Show until December 2007.

Other television shows Blackman has appeared on and announced for include Blankety Blanks, Personality Squares, The Paul Hogan Show, The Daryl Somers Tonight Show, Holiday Island, Family Feud and many others. Blackman was interviewed on ABC's Talking Heads in 2006.

In 2009, Blackman returned as part of the Hey Hey It's Saturday reunion specials to reprise his voice-over role. Despite respectable ratings, the show's contract was not renewed for 2011.

From April 2015 to May 2016, he was employed at MAGIC 1278 in Melbourne and MAGIC 882 in Brisbane as their Breakfast Announcer between 6.00am and 10.00am, initially as co-host with Jane Holmes, who resigned in April 2015 for personal reasons. Blackman continued in a solo role until May 2016, when he was unceremoniously dumped by Macquarie Media Ltd.

According to the MML COO, Adam Lang, “He’s a very respected and highly regarded broadcaster but his style of broadcasting, while excellent, wasn’t working on the MAGIC format.”

Significantly, in the third radio survey for 2016, (released a few days later) Blackman actually increased his Melbourne audience from 1.5% to 2.2% and his cumulative audience to 19,000 listeners (2,000 more than the station average).

Corporate work
Blackman is a corporate host and compere for over 800 business award nights, conferences and social occasions. He also regularly voices radio and television advertisements.

Writing
Blackman has authored several books, including Aussie Slang, Aussie Gags (1998) and More Aussie Gags, Don't Come the Raw Prawn, Best of Aussie Slang, Aussie Slang Dictionary, and the Dickie Knee Bumper Comic Book. They were released through Pan Macmillan Australia.

Personal life
Blackman has been married twice. He married his second wife Cecile on 2 December 1972, and they have an adult daughter.

On Christmas Eve 2007, Blackman suffered a seizure brought on by a golf ball size (benign) meningioma brain tumour. After six hours of surgery, it was successfully removed at The Alfred Hospital in Melbourne and he had a full recovery.

Blackman was also diagnosed with an aggressive form of skin cancer in 2019, resulting in his jaw being removed. The cancer reappeared in 2022, with Blackman undergoing extensive surgery to remove the top of his skull and the skin from his scalp.

Community/charity work
Blackman is a member of the Patrons Council of the Epilepsy Foundation of Victoria. and an active Australia Day (Victoria) ambassador. He is also a past committee member and  past vice-chairman of Variety – the Children's Charity, currently an honorary member.

Famous characters
 Dickie Knee – a polystyrene head with black hair and a blue cap on a stick
 Alfred Desk Mike
 The Angel – a small angelic creature made from an old Barbie doll and superimposed on the screen
 Doctor Ben Dover
 Charlie Who – a Chinese character
 The Giant
 The Man from Jupiter
 Mrs Macgillicuddy – a hideous old hag with a raspy voice
 Norman Neumann – a boom microphone with a moustache, which is in fact a Sennheiser MKH-816-P48
 Sammy Sanhiser – replacement for Norman
 Baby Kangaroos – sounds a bit like the Angel

Radio career
2GN Morning Show (1969)
2CA Morning Show (1970)
3AW Evening Show (1972)
3AK Breakfast Show (1975)
2UE Night Show (1977)
2GB Breakfast (1977 [one week])
3AK Breakfast Show (1979)
3AW Breakfast Show (1981–1986)
3AK/2UE CBC Network Breakfast Show (1986–1987)
3UZ Breakfast Show (1987–1990)
3AK Breakfast Show (1997–2000)
Triple M Adelaide Breakfast Show (2005–2007)
3GG Mornings (2009–2014)
3AW Afternoon replacement for Denis Walter (2011)
3AW fill-in host on 3AW's Nightline program (2012–)
Magic 1278 and Magic 882 Breakfast (201–2016)

Television career
Hey Hey It's Saturday (1971–99, 2009–10) (Nine Network)
Family Feud – announcer for over 1500 shows (Nine Network)
Daytime newsreader (TCN 9)
Penthouse Club (HSV 7)
Paul Hogan Show (GTV 9)
Daryl & Ossie Show (ATV 10)
Personality Squares (ATV 10)
Daryl Somers Tonight Show (GTV 9)
Blankety Blanks (ATV 10)
Holiday Island (ATV 10)
Prisoner (ATV 10)
Safeway New Faces judge (GTV 9)
World's Craziest Inventions (GTV 9)
Toon Time (111 Hits)

References

External links
Official John Blackman Website
John Blackman Celebrity Speaker

3AW presenters
Radio and television announcers
Australian television presenters
Australian male voice actors
Australian comedy writers
Radio personalities from Melbourne
1947 births
Living people
People from Mount Waverley, Victoria